Jeff is an unincorporated community in Oregon County, in the U.S. state of Missouri.

The community is on Missouri Route V approximately seven miles east of Thayer. It is one mile north of the Missouri-Arkansas state line. The community of Farewell is 1.5 miles to the east on Route V.

History
A post office called Jeff was established in 1884, and remained in operation until 1914. The community's name is derived from the last name from Joseph Jeffers, the proprietor of a local mill.

References

Unincorporated communities in Oregon County, Missouri
Unincorporated communities in Missouri